David Anderson (10 February 1814 – 5 November 1885) was a Church of England priest and the first bishop of Rupert's Land, Canada.

Career
Born in London, England, Anderson was educated at University of Edinburgh and Exeter College, Oxford. He was the vice-principal of St Bees Theological College, Cumberland (1841–1847) and an incumbent of All Saint's, Derby (1848–1849). He was consecrated a bishop on 29 May 1849 at Canterbury Cathedral, by John Bird Sumner, Archbishop of Canterbury. In 1849, he arrived at the Red River Colony as the Bishop of Rupert's Land. He lived there until 1864, the year he returned to England. He was later vicar of Clifton (where he is buried) and chancellor of St. Paul's Cathedral, London. He received the degree of Doctor of Divinity in 1849. He was the author of Notes on the Flood, Net in the Bay and other works.

References

Burpee, Lawrence J. Index and Dictionary of Canadian History. 1912.
The Times, Friday, 6 Nov 1885; pg. 5; Issue 31597; col F Obituary

External links
 Biography at the Dictionary of Canadian Biography Online
 Bibliographic directory from Project Canterbury
 

1814 births
1885 deaths
Anglican bishops of Rupert's Land
19th-century Anglican Church of Canada bishops
Alumni of the University of Edinburgh
Anglican clergy from London
Chancellors of St Paul's Cathedral
Alumni of St Bees Theological College